Buffalo Creek is an  river in central Minnesota. It is a tributary of the South Fork of the Crow River, which is a tributary of the Mississippi River.

Buffalo Creek was so named from the fact buffalo bones were found there by pioneer settlers.

See also
List of rivers of Minnesota

References

Minnesota Watersheds
USGS Hydrologic Unit Map - State of Minnesota (1974)

Rivers of McLeod County, Minnesota
Rivers of Carver County, Minnesota
Rivers of Sibley County, Minnesota
Rivers of Renville County, Minnesota
Rivers of Kandiyohi County, Minnesota
Rivers of Minnesota
Tributaries of the Mississippi River